Aliabad-e Kuh Namaki (also Romanized as ‘Alīābād-e Kūh Namakī; also known as ‘Alīābād Namakī) is a village in Ravar Rural District, in the Central District of Ravar County, Kerman Province, Iran. At the 2006 census, its population was 23, in 8 families.

References 

Populated places in Ravar County